Harling may refer to:

Places
 Harling, Norfolk, the parish of which East Harling is the principal settlement and include Middle Harling and West Harling
 East Harling, a village in Norfolk, England
 Harling Road railway station, station servicing Harling
 Harling Point, a Chinese cemetery in Victoria, British Columbia

Other uses
 Harling (surname)
 Operation Harling, British World War II sabotage mission in Greece
 Harling, a kind of wall finish
 Harling,  a method of boat fishing developed on the River Tay for salmon where lures and flies are drifted across and down the current by the boat.

See also
 Harlington (disambiguation), several places